The Geothermal Development Company (GDC) is a wholly owned parastatal of the Government of Kenya. It is mandated to execute surface geothermal development, including prospecting for, drilling, harnessing and selling geothermal energy to electricity-generating companies for energy production and sale to the national grid.

Location
The headquarters of GDC are located in the capital city of Nairobi, at Kawi House, in the neighborhood known as South C.

Overview
The country was heavily dependent on hydroelectric energy from the time of independence until the early 2000s. Due to unpredictable rainfall patterns, the levels of the country's rivers fell and Kenya underwent a marked reduction in electricity output in the 2003 - 2006 time frame. In an attempt to reduce the over-reliance on hydroelectric energy and its susceptibility to weather changes, GDC was formed in 2008 as a Special Purpose Vehicle to carry out rapid geothermal exploration and drilling in the country to enable the Kenya Electricity Generating Company and Independent Power Producers (IPPs) to build power stations and not only diversify the national electricity grid, but also to fulfil a pledge to install 5,000 MW of electricity in the country by the year 2030. 

Outside development partners have offered help. GDC has plans to develop academic courses in geothermal energy at Kenyan universities, starting with courses at Dedan Kimathi University of Technology.

Recent developments
In November 2015, seven senior managers' employment at GDC was terminated due to tendering irregularities. In August 2016, replacements for those terminated executives were advertised. In the 12 months ending 30 June 2015, the agency is reported to have made an after-tax profit of KES:1.6 billion (USD:16 million).

In 2020, a new CEO was appointed to head the organisation, replacing the previous one who served for one term.

See also
List of power stations in Kenya
Kenya Electricity Generating Company
Kenya Power and Lighting Company
Geothermal power in Kenya

References

External links
 Website of Geothermal Development Company
Website of the Ministry of Energy
 Kenya: Fresh Graft Claims in Geo-Thermal Power - 28 November 2014

Energy in Kenya
Economy of Kenya
Geography of Kenya
Nairobi